Unleavened Bread is a 1900 novel by American writer Robert Grant, and one of the best selling books of that year.

Plot introduction
A businessman's selfish wife forces her way into upper society.

Play
The novel was also adapted into a Broadway play in 1901, directed by Leo Ditrichstein. The "thoroughly detestable" part of Selma White in the play was played by Elizabeth Tyree.

References

External links
Online text at Project Gutenberg
 

1900 American novels
Charles Scribner's Sons books